Chmieleń is a village in the administrative district of Gmina Lubomierz, within Lwówek Śląski County, Lower Silesian Voivodeship, in south-western Poland.

The village has a population of 560.

References

Villages in Lwówek Śląski County